505 Marquette Avenue NW (originally known as the National Building) is a high-rise office building located at 505 Marquette Avenue NW in Downtown Albuquerque, New Mexico. It was the tallest building in New Mexico upon its completion and remained the holder of that title until the completion of the Albuquerque Plaza towers in 1990, making it currently the third tallest.

Ground was broken on the building on January 25, 1965, and it was completed in 1966, surpassing the Bank of the West Tower and becoming the tallest building in the city. The project was developed by the National Building Corporation of Tennessee.

Architecture
The building was designed by William E. Burk, Jr., who also designed the Park Plaza Condominiums. It has twelve floors of office space above a wider six-story base which incorporates a parking garage on floors 2–6. The exterior walls of the parking levels are molded concrete with an open grillwork pattern of stylized quatrefoils inspired by Moorish architecture. The upper floors have recessed rectangular windows arranged in a simple grid pattern with beveled surrounds. At the ground level, the exterior walls are battered masonry punctuated by narrow paired windows on the south side.

See also
List of tallest buildings in Albuquerque

References

Bank buildings in New Mexico
Skyscraper office buildings in Albuquerque, New Mexico
History of Microsoft
Bank company headquarters in the United States
Office buildings completed in 1965
Modernist architecture in New Mexico
1965 establishments in New Mexico